Rugby 2005 is a game in the Rugby series by EA Sports.  The game allows players to play as many Rugby nations, both major and minor, and includes many tournaments, such as the Rugby World Cup, the Tri Nations, the Six Nations, and the Super 12.

The newer version of this game is Rugby 06, also by EA Sports.  It also includes a fictional "World League" where teams from the Guinness Premiership, Celtic League, Top 14, Super 12, and other domestic leagues compete against each other in a three-stage promotion and regulation structure with a knock out cup also contested.  Commentary is provided by Ian Robertson and Murray Mexted.

Rugby 2005 is the first EA Rugby title for Xbox, while the Windows version was canceled in the US.

Reception

The PC and Xbox versions received "generally favorable reviews", while the PlayStation 2 version received "average" reviews, according to the review aggregation website Metacritic.

References

External links

2005 video games
PlayStation 2 games
Rugby union video games
Windows games
Video games developed in Canada
Xbox games
EA Sports games